Uricite is a rare organic mineral form of uric acid, C5H4N4O3. It is a soft yellowish white mineral which crystallizes in the monoclinic system.

Discovery and occurrence
It was first described in 1973 for an occurrence in bat guano in Dingo Donga Cave, Eucla, Western Australia. The name is for its composition, anhydrous uric acid. 
It occurs with biphosphammite, brushite and syngenite at the type locality in Dingo Donga Cave.

References

Organic minerals
Monoclinic minerals
Minerals in space group 14
Minerals described in 1973